Toussaint (French for All Saints' Day, literally: "All Saints") may refer to:

 Toussaint (name) (list of people named Toussaint)
 Toussaint, Seine-Maritime, a commune in the arrondissement of Le Havre in the Seine-Maritime département of France
 Toussaint hierarchy, a mathematical hierarchy of graphs devised by Godfried Toussaint
 Akl–Toussaint heuristic, part of the Toussaint hierarchy
 Toussaint (film), a 2009 film about Haitian liberator Toussaint Louverture
 Toussaint (album), a 1971 album by Allen Toussaint
 Toussaint Coffee Liqueur, a coffee-flavoured liqueur named after the Haitian revolutionary hero Toussaint Louverture
 Toussaint, an opera by David Blake
Toussaint, a fictional duchy from The Witcher franchise
 T'Challa II, also known as Toussaint, the son of T'Challa / Black Panther and Nakia in the Marvel Cinematic Universe film Black Panther: Wakanda Forever

See also

 
 All Saints (disambiguation)
 Toussaint Louverture (disambiguation)